Podospora is a genus of fungi in the family Podosporaceae. Fossils of Podospora have been reported from 12 million year old rocks from central England.

Species
Podospora adelura 
Podospora alexandri 
Podospora ampullacea 
Podospora anamalayensis 
Podospora anomala 
Podospora apiculifera 
Podospora appendiculata 
Podospora araneosa 
Podospora argentinensis 
Podospora australis 
Podospora austroamericana 
Podospora austrohemisphaerica 
Podospora badia 
Podospora bicolor 
Podospora bicornis 
Podospora bifida 
Podospora brasiliensis 
Podospora bulbillosa 
Podospora bullata 
Podospora cainii 
Podospora caligata 
Podospora caprarum 
Podospora castorinospora 
Podospora castorinospra 
Podospora cecropiae 
Podospora cochleariformis 
Podospora coeruleotecta 
Podospora collapsa 
Podospora communis 
Podospora cryptospora 
Podospora cupiformis 
Podospora curvicolla 
Podospora dactylina 
Podospora dagobertii 
Podospora dasypogon 
Podospora decidua 
Podospora decipiens 
Podospora deltoides 
Podospora deropodalis 
Podospora didyma 
Podospora dimorpha 
Podospora dolichopodalis 
Podospora egyptiaca 
Podospora ellisiana 
Podospora euphratica 
Podospora excentrica 
Podospora fabiformis 
Podospora fibrinocaudata 
Podospora filiformis 
Podospora fimiseda 
Podospora gigantea 
Podospora globosa 
Podospora granulostriata 
Podospora gwynne-vaughaniae 
Podospora hirsuta 
Podospora horridula 
Podospora hyalopilosa 
Podospora ignata 
Podospora ignota 
Podospora immersa 
Podospora inaequilateralis 
Podospora inflatula 
Podospora inquinata 
Podospora intestinacea 
Podospora karachiensis 
Podospora kilimandscharica 
Podospora lautarea 
Podospora leporina 
Podospora levis 
Podospora lindquistii 
Podospora longicaudata 
Podospora longicollis 
Podospora longispora 
Podospora macrodecipiens 
Podospora macropodalis 
Podospora mexicana 
Podospora millespora 
Podospora minicauda 
Podospora minipistillata 
Podospora minor 
Podospora multicaudiculata 
Podospora multispora 
Podospora myriospora 
Podospora obclavata 
Podospora ontariensis 
Podospora ostlingospora 
Podospora papilionacea 
Podospora papillata 
Podospora papilliformis 
Podospora pectinata 
Podospora perplexens 
Podospora petrogale 
Podospora pistillata 
Podospora platensis 
Podospora pleiospora 
Podospora praecox 
Podospora prethopodalis 
Podospora prolifica 
Podospora pseudoinquinata 
Podospora pyriformis 
Podospora roselliniella 
Podospora selenospora 
Podospora seminuda 
Podospora serotina 
Podospora sibirica 
Podospora spinulosa 
Podospora strobiliformis 
Podospora taenioides 
Podospora tarvisina 
Podospora trichomanes 
Podospora unicaudata 
Podospora venezuelensis 
Podospora vertesensis 
Podospora xerampelina

References

Lasiosphaeriaceae